The 2011 Men's Hockey Champions Challenge was held from November 26 to December 4, 2011 in Johannesburg, South Africa.

Belgium won the tournament for the first time after defeating India 4–3 in the final.

Teams
The FIH announced the eight participating teams on December 16, 2010.

Results

First round
All times are South African Time (UTC+02:00)

Pool A

Pool B

Second round

Quarterfinals

Fifth to eighth place classification

Cross-overs

Seventh and eighth place

Fifth and sixth place

First to fourth place classification

Semifinals

Third and fourth place

Final

Awards

Statistics

Final ranking

References

External links
Official website

Men's Hockey Champions Challenge I
Champions Challenge I
Men's Hockey Champions Challenge I
2011